Montecalvo may refer to a number of places in Italy:

Montecalvo in Foglia, Province of Pesaro and Urbino, March
Montecalvo Irpino, Province of Avellino, Campania
Montecalvo Versiggia, Province of Pavia, Lombardy

Other uses
Montecalvo (grape), another name for the Italian wine grape Falanghina
Frankie Montecalvo, American racing driver

See also
Moncalvo, Province of Alessandria, Piedmont